Gunnar Emil Garfors (1900–1979) was a Norwegian poet from Ankenes near Narvik, but born in Skjomen."Under høg himmel" was published posthumously in 1980. Garfors was awarded the Norwegian King's Service Medal in Silver for his work within education and his fight against tobacco smoking.

1900 births
1979 deaths
20th-century Norwegian poets
Norwegian male poets
20th-century Norwegian male writers